Inside the Law is a 1942 American film directed by Hamilton MacFadden. It is also known as Rogues in Clover.

Cast 
Wallace Ford as Billy
Frank Sully as Jim Burke
Harry Holman as Judge Mortimer Gibbs
Luana Walters as Dora Mason
Lafe McKee as Pop Cobb
Barton Hepburn as Paul Kane
Danny Duncan as Peter Clifford
Earle Hodgins as Police Chief
Rose Plumer as Mom Cobb
Robert Frazer as Bank Official

Soundtrack

External links

References

1942 films
American black-and-white films
American comedy-drama films
Producers Releasing Corporation films
Films directed by Hamilton MacFadden
1942 comedy-drama films
1940s English-language films
1940s American films